Ninian Wirt Edwards (April 15, 1809 – September 2, 1899) was an American politician.

Born in Sangamon County, Illinois, Edwards was the son of Ninian Edwards (who served as territorial and state governor of Illinois). He was married to Elizabeth Todd, sister of Mary Todd Lincoln who was married to President Abraham Lincoln. In 1834–1835, Edwards served as Illinois attorney general. Then during 1837–1841 and 1849–1853 he served in the Illinois House of Representatives. Edwards also served in the Illinois State Senate 1845–1849. He then served in the Illinois Constitutional Convention of 1847 and was Illinois superintendent of public instruction in 1854–1857.

Notes

1809 births
1889 deaths
People from Sangamon County, Illinois
Illinois Attorneys General
Illinois state senators
Illinois State Superintendents
Members of the Illinois House of Representatives
Educators from Illinois
19th-century American politicians
19th-century American educators